Choconta is a genus of froghoppers in the family of Cercopidae. The genus was described first by Fennah in 1979.

Etymology and habitat 
The genus is named after the town of Chocontá, Cundinamarca, on the Altiplano Cundiboyacense, Colombia. Its species are endemic to Colombia, Venezuela, Bolivia, and Peru.

References 

Cercopidae
Insects of South America
Altiplano Cundiboyacense
Muysccubun
Insects described in 1979